released under different names in some regions, is a 2002 role-playing video game for the Game Boy Advance, developed by Camelot Software Planning and published by Nintendo, as well as their last game released before Hiroshi Yamauchi retired as President of Nintendo.  It is the second installment in the Golden Sun series and was released on June 28, 2002, in Japan, and through 2003 in North America and Europe.

Picking up the story during the events of the previous game, The Lost Age puts the player into the roles of the previous games' antagonists, primarily from the perspective of magic-attuned "adepts" Felix and his allies as they seek to restore the power of alchemy to the world of Weyard. Along the way, the player uses psynergy to defeat enemies and discover new locations, help out local populations, and find elemental djinn which augment the characters' powers. Players can transfer their characters and items from Golden Sun to The Lost Age by means of a password system or Game Link Cable, and players are rewarded for fully completing both games.

Upon release, The Lost Age was positively received by critics and audiences. IGN ranked the game as the eighth-best Game Boy Advance title of 2003 and the 22nd-best GBA game of all time. It has sold over 680,000 units. It was eventually followed by a third installment, titled Dark Dawn, released in 2010 and set thirty years after the two original games.

Like its predecessor, The Lost Age was re-released for the Wii U's Virtual Console service via the Nintendo eShop. It became available first in Japan on July 23, 2014, and later in North America and PAL regions.

Gameplay 

The Lost Age presents a similar traditional role-playing video game formula that its first half pioneered. Players guide a cast of characters as they journey through a fantasy-themed world, interact with other characters, battle monsters, acquire increasingly powerful magic spells and equipment, and take part in a building, predefined narrative. While many actions the player takes are compulsory and central to the story, The Lost Age allows the player to complete many objectives in the order of their choice; visiting previous locations to advance story elements and complete gameplay objectives are given a stronger emphasis than in the previous game.

Much of the time spent outside of battle takes place either in the game's overworld or within dungeons, caves, and other locales with puzzles integrated into their layout. Unlike the original game, in which the overworld was explored on foot except for a brief, non-navigable boat ride, a large portion of The Lost Age's gameplay involves navigating a magical ship across a large sea, visiting continents and islands. To complete puzzles, players must either push pillars to construct negotiable paths between elevated areas, climb up or descend cliffs, or obtain a special item to progress through the story and game world. Many of these puzzles revolve heavily around the usage of the game's resident form of magic spells, Psynergy, requiring the player to find items that grant the bearer new forms of Psynergy in order to accomplish tasks. Acquiring new Psynergy spells gives players access to new locations and secrets hidden within the game world.

Whereas many role-playing video games limit the usage of their forms of magic to battles as offensive and defensive measures, Psynergy spells are also heavily used in puzzles and exploration. Some types of Psynergy can only be used in combat; conversely, some spells are only used in the game's overworld and in non-battle scenarios. Still other Psynergy can be used for both situations; for example, the “Frost” spell can be used to damage enemies in battle, or to transform puddles of water into elongated pillars of ice as part of a puzzle. The player gains more and more Psynergy spells as the game progresses, either through levelling up or acquiring and equipping, or using, special items, and with each "utility" Psynergy spell the party gains access to more locations and secrets hidden within the game world. Players will be required to return to previous locations in the game to finish off puzzles which they could not solve earlier because of the lack of specific Psynergy spells.

Battle 

The Lost Age contains both random monster encounters and compulsory battles that advance the story. When a battle begins, a separate screen is brought up where the enemy party is on the opposing side and the player's party is on the battling side. While a battle being is conducted, the characters and background swirl around and change positions in a pseudo-3D effect.

Gameplay in relation to The Lost Age's battle mode is similar to traditional role-playing video games. In each battle, the player is required to defeat all the enemies using direct attacks with weapons, offensive Psynergy spells, and other means of causing damage, all while keeping their own party alive through items and supportive Psynergy that restore life and supplement defense. If all the player's characters are downed by reducing their hit points to zero, the party is returned to the last village that the player visited and suffers a monetary penalty. The successful completion of a battle yields experience points, coins, and occasionally rare items. In addition to the main game itself, there is also a competitive battling mode accessible from the menu screen, where players can enter their teams into an arena to battle increasingly difficult CPU-controlled enemies or other players head-to-head.

Djinn system 

One of the most important features in the Golden Sun series is the collection and manipulation of elemental creatures called Djinn (singular: Djinni), and The Lost Age introduces a host of new Djinn. They can be found scattered in hiding throughout the game. There are eleven Djinn for each of the four elements (not counting the ones that can only be found in the original Golden Sun) that may be allocated to each character.  Djinn form the basis of the game's statistics enhancement system, and the way they are allocated to different characters modifies the characters' classes, increasing maximum hit points, Psynergy points, and other statistics, and also alters the available Psynergy that the characters can perform. Djinni may also be used to directly attack an opponent, and once used, Djinn no longer contribute to a character's class but can be used to summon a powerful elemental spirit to attack an opponent. This is the game's most powerful method of attack, and also the riskiest, as it requires Djinn to be on standby and therefore not available to bolster the statistics of whichever character the Djinni is equipped to.  Once a Djinni on Standby has been used for a Summon Sequence, it takes a number of turns recovering before it restores itself to Set position on a character, but a subsequent increase in the affinity of the element of the attack is bolstered on the character for the duration of the battle.

Synopsis

Characters 

For much of the game, the player controls four characters: Felix is an eighteen-year-old Venus Adept from the village of Vale, who was an anti-hero in Golden Sun but serves as the game's new protagonist. His younger sister, Jenna, a seventeen-year-old Mars Adept also from Vale, and a fourteen-year-old girl and Jupiter Adept named Sheba, as well as a sharp-witted elderly scholar named Kraden, are all hostages that Felix was forced to take with his now-deceased masters, the Mars Adept warriors Saturos and Menardi that served as the previous game's antagonists. In this game, the player takes the role of Felix as he strives to complete Saturos and Menardi's original objective to restore Alchemy to the world of Weyard, and joining them early on is a Mercury Adept named Piers, a mysterious young man whose ship Felix's party uses to explore the world throughout their journey.

Several groups of characters serve as Felix's antagonists in The Lost Age. He is at odds with the heroes of the original Golden Sun, led by the young Venus Adept warrior Isaac, who pursue him across the World, Weyard under the belief that Alchemy would potentially destroy Weyard if unleashed. One of Saturos' original companions, a powerful and enigmatic Mercury Adept named Alex, allies himself with a second pair of powerful and imposing Mars Adept warriors, Karst and Agatio, the former of whom is Menardi's younger sister. They keep the pressure on Felix to ensure he proceeds with his quest as he is supposed to.

Plot 

The Lost Age takes place in the same fantasy world as its predecessor, that of the world of "Weyard". It is a flat, vaguely circular plane whose oceans perpetually spill off the edge of the world's entire perimeter into what seems to be an endless abyss, although no one knows what is over it.

The antagonists of the previous game, Saturos and Menardi, have been slain in battle by the game's protagonists led by Isaac, but not before the pair succeeded in activating two of four great lighthouses situated across the world of Weyard, the Elemental Lighthouses. Saturos' companion Felix takes the rest of Saturos' group and sets out on a journey of his own to complete Saturos' original objective to activate the remaining two Lighthouses, for lighting all four will achieve the restoration of the powerful force of Alchemy to Weyard. He is joined by his sister Jenna, a Jupiter Adept named Sheba who was previously kidnapped by Saturos, and the scholar Kraden. The group searches for a ship to cross to the western half of Weyard, and learns of a man named Piers who has been falsely accused of piracy and owns a ship they can use. Felix and his group clear his name, and Piers agrees to join them. During this, Isaac's party continues to pursue them. The group also discovers that their former companion Alex has allied himself with Menardi's younger sister Karst and her partner Agatio in order to keep Felix on track.

Eventually, Felix's party is able to achieve entrance into Piers' home, a legendary, secluded Atlantis-like society named Lemuria far out in the ocean. When they convene with Lemuria's ancient king, Hydros, they learn about Alchemy's true nature; it has always been the sustenance of Weyard's very life force, and its absence over the past ages has caused the world's continents to decrease in size and parts of the world to collapse into the abyss. Knowing that restoring Alchemy is what must be done to actually save the world, Felix crosses the sea in order to activate Jupiter Lighthouse. But when Isaac's pursuing party enters the lighthouse, they are trapped and ambushed by Karst and Agatio. Felix rescues Isaac, but Karst and Agatio escape with the Mars Star formerly in Isaac's possession.

Felix is finally able to explain to Isaac why Alchemy's release is a necessary thing for everyone, and that Saturos and Menardi were aiming for this goal merely for the sake of the survival of their home colony of Prox to the far north, located near the Mars Lighthouse. He also reveals that his parents and Isaac's father are alive and currently being held hostage in Prox in order to coerce Felix's initial cooperation. Isaac and his company agree to aid Felix, and the group sets out north to activate the Mars Lighthouse. The group discovers that Karst and Agatio have been transformed into mindless dragons and are forced to defeat them - they return the Mars Star before succumbing to their wounds. When they reach the tower's top, the Wise One, the entity responsible for originally tasking Isaac to prevent the breaking of Alchemy's seal, confronts them. He warns them that mankind could very well destroy Weyard themselves if they had possession of such a power, and when Isaac insists on breaking the seal regardless the Wise One summons a giant, three-headed dragon for the party to battle in the final struggle. After slaying the dragon, the party of Adepts finish their objective and activate Mars Lighthouse; with all four towers across Weyard lit, the process that heralds the return of the force of Alchemy to Weyard ensues at the mountain sanctum Mt. Aleph. Alex is there, however; he took advantage of everyone else's quests so that he would gain immense power for himself from the light of the Golden Sun, a manifestation of Alchemy itself. However, he discovers that the Wise One had taken steps to prevent this and is left to die as the mountain sinks into the earth.

Development 

The Lost Age was first revealed to Japan in early 2002, with the magazine Famitsu being the first publication to review the game. The Lost Age was highly anticipated; it topped IGN's list of Game Boy Advance "Most Wanted" games for 2003. The North American version of the game was playable at Electronic Entertainment Expo 2002, and IGN noted that the opening of the game did away with the notoriously boring opening sequence of Golden Sun, introducing the characters in between the action. GameSpot previewed a localized copy of The Lost Age in February 2003, and noted that the game built on its predecessor's graphics engine, with "the environments in the game featuring rich detail with little touches— such as birds that fly off as you approach."

Reception 

The Lost Age generally received positive reviews, but critics were divided on whether or not the game was better than the original Golden Sun.
On Metacritic, The Lost Age has an 86% aggregate rating, compared to Golden Sun's 91%. Likewise, GameRankings gives The Lost Age an 87% overall rating, slightly lower than Golden Sun's 90%. Conversely, The Lost Age was ranked 78 on IGN's Readers Choice Top 100 games ever, higher than its predecessor. It was also rated the 69th best game made on a Nintendo System in Nintendo Power's "Top 200 Games" list.

IGN gave the sequel high praise; while most of the game mechanics remained unchanged, the addition of more complicated puzzles was welcomed. The Lost Age subsequently became IGN's "Game of the Month" in April 2003. Shane Bettenhausen of Electronic Gaming Monthly argued that though The Lost Age is "not going to win any originality contests (this looks, sounds, and feels nearly identical to its predecessor), but when more of the same means more top-notch roleplaying, I can't complain". Other publications singled out the graphics and audio as particularly strong features. The publication later named The Lost Age the best Game Boy Advance game of April 2003.

Some publications found fault with complaints which remained from the original, including the combat system. IGN and GamePro took issue with the lack of "smart" combat; if an enemy is killed before other party members attack it, those members switch to defense instead of intelligently attacking the remaining enemies. Ethan Einhorn of GameNOW felt that the only elements that set the fighting system above "typical RPG fare" were the graphics. GameSpy felt that Camelot could have added more features, and criticized the long opening sequence which either alienated players of the previous game, or confused new players by swamping them with unfamiliar places and characters.

The Lost Age sold 96,000 units in its first week in Japan, being the best-selling game of the period. The game sold a total of 249,000 copies in Japan and 437,000 in North America by November 21, 2004.

Notes

References

External links 
 Official website

2002 video games
Game Boy Advance games
Game Boy Advance-only games
Golden Sun
Video games developed in Japan
Video games scored by Motoi Sakuraba
Video game sequels
Virtual Console games
Virtual Console games for Wii U
Jinn in popular culture

de:Golden Sun#Golden Sun: Die vergessene Epoche